The 2017–18 Idaho Vandals men's basketball team represented the University of Idaho during the 2017–18 NCAA Division I men's basketball season. The Vandals, led by tenth-year head coach Don Verlin, played their home games at the Cowan Spectrum, with a few early season games at Memorial Gym, in Moscow, Idaho as members of the Big Sky Conference. They finished the season 22–9, 14–4 in Big Sky play to finish in second place. They lost in the quarterfinals of the Big Sky tournament to Southern Utah.

Previous season
The Vandals finished the 2016–17 season 19–14, 12–6 in Big Sky play to finish in a tie for third place. Big Sky tournament. They defeated Montana in the quarterfinals of the Big Sky tournament before losing in the semifinals to North Dakota. They were invited to the CollegeInsider.com Tournament where they defeated Stephen F. Austin before losing in the second round to Texas State.

Offseason

Departures

2017 recruiting class

Preseason 
In separate preseason polls of league coaches and media, the Vandals were picked to win the Big Sky championship. Senior guard Victor Sanders was named to the preseason All-Big Sky team.

Roster

Schedule and results

|-
!colspan=9 style=|Exhibition

|-
!colspan=9 style=| Non-conference regular season

|-
!colspan=9 style=| Big Sky regular season

|-
!colspan=9 style=| Big Sky tournament

References

Idaho
Idaho Vandals men's basketball seasons
Idaho
Idaho